3 FTS may refer to:
3 Canadian Forces Flying Training School
No. 3 Flying Training School RAF